The Ciné-Kodak was the first 16mm camera, introduced in 1923 by the Eastman Kodak Company. It was intended to be used for home movie making.

History
The first prototype was a leather covered rectangular wooden box, which evolved into a final cast aluminum box approximately 8.0 " high by 8.5" long by 4.5" wide", and was cranked by hand at two turns per second to achieve the necessary 16 frames per second. Hand cranking meant that a tripod was essential to achieve a steady image. The camera was equipped with a fixed 1-inch (25mm) lens. Early in 1924 a battery-powered electric motor attachment was introduced, but discontinued in 1926, at which time an improved version of the camera with an interchangeable Kodak Anastigmat f/1.9 lens was introduced. The lens focal range was 2 to 50 feet and INF (infinity). The only additional lens offered was a 78mm f/4.5 telephoto. With the discontinuation of the motor, additional crank accessories were introduced: one for single frames, and one with a 4:1 gear ratio for slow motion work.

In 1925, Kodak followed with a spring motor-driven Ciné-Kodak Model B, at which time the original Ciné-Kodak was re-designated as Model A, though that designation was not added to the camera nameplate until November 1929.  A full winding of the spring would run the motor for about fifteen to twenty feet of film. Special Editions of the Model B were released with ostrich leather covering the camera body and carrying case.  Production of Model A ceased in 1930; the Model B in 1931.

In 1929, a Model BB for 50-ft reels and an additional 8 frames/second speed was introduced, followed by the Model K in 1930, which was an enlarged BB for 100-ft reels. The Model K was joined briefly by a stripped-down Model M, but the latter camera did not sell well since it lacked some of the very features that made the Model K appealing.

In 1933, the Ciné-Kodak Special was introduced for advanced amateur and semi-professional work, and quickly became popular with professionals for its vast range of capabilities. Later in the 1930s a new universal Kodak S-mount was introduced with this camera. The Ciné-Kodak Special II was introduced in 1948 with a diverging turret to allow for mounting a longer second lens without interfering with the field of view of the shorter focal length, but was otherwise unchanged from the Special. The Special was discontinued in the early 1960s, although a Reflex Special was available until late in the decade.

In 1937, the Model E was introduced with a shape similar to the later Pathé Webo camera and provided slow motion speeds and an internal viewfinder instead of the open frame types used hitherto. The final 16mm spool loading Ciné-Kodak, the K100, arrived in 1956 with both turret and non-turret versions.

The mid-1930s saw the beginning of a line of magazine-loading cameras, the Magazine Ciné-Kodaks, made initially in Kodak's Nagel Works in Germany. The 16mm Ciné-Kodaks were well-made, long-lived cameras. Most have double claws and double sprockets and hence require double perf (2R) film in unmodified form. The exceptions are both the Specials and K100 models that were designed for single perf (1R) film, which allowed for the addition of sound tracks.

8mm Cameras
The Ciné-Kodak brand was also applied to the double run 8mm cameras introduced by Kodak in 1932 beginning with the Eight Twenty model.

References

See also
History of photography
History of the camera

Kodak cameras
Movie cameras